Deng Zhiwei (born February 1, 1988) is a Chinese heavyweight freestyle wrestler who won a Silver medal at the 2018 World Wrestling Championships and a Bronze medal at the 2019 World Wrestling Championships.

Career
Deng competed at the 2016 Olympics, and was eliminated in the round of 16 by Levan Berianidze.

Deng returned to the 2020 Olympics, where he achieved greater success. He came 5th place after losing the Bronze Medal match to Amir Hossein Zare (who would later win the 2021 World Wrestling Championships just two months later).

He competed in the 125kg event at the 2022 World Wrestling Championships held in Belgrade, Serbia.

Major results

References

External links

 
 
 

1988 births
Living people
Chinese male sport wrestlers
Olympic wrestlers of China
Wrestlers at the 2016 Summer Olympics
Wrestlers at the 2014 Asian Games
Wrestlers at the 2018 Asian Games
Medalists at the 2018 Asian Games
Asian Games silver medalists for China
Asian Games medalists in wrestling
World Wrestling Championships medalists
Asian Wrestling Championships medalists
Wrestlers at the 2020 Summer Olympics
21st-century Chinese people